Harlem Township is located in Stephenson County, Illinois. As of the 2010 census, its population was 2,275 and it contained 981 housing units.

Geography
Harlem is Township 27 North, Range 7 East of the Fourth Principal Meridian.

Stagecoach inns
Tisdel Inn (Section 21) was built in 1852 by P.A. Tisdel along the Old State Road number 2, now Business U.S. Route 20. Frink, Walker & Company stage line, Chicago to Galena, used this road 1839 to 1854. The stone inn is now a residence.

Demographics

References

External links
City-data.com
Stephenson County Official Site

Townships in Stephenson County, Illinois
Townships in Illinois